Albert Gijsen (16 August 1915 – 24 February 2007) was a Dutch racing cyclist. He rode in the 1936 Tour de France.

References

1915 births
2007 deaths
Dutch male cyclists
Place of birth missing